The 1977–78 Washington Capitals season was the Washington Capitals fourth season in the National Hockey League (NHL).

Offseason

Regular season

Final standings

Schedule and results

Playoffs
The Capitals still had several years to go before they would win enough games to qualify for the playoffs. The 1977–78 season was the fourth season in a row that the Capitals missed the playoffs.

Player statistics

Regular season
Scoring

Goaltending

Note: GP = Games played; G = Goals; A = Assists; Pts = Points; +/- = Plus/Minus; PIM = Penalty minutes; PPG=Power-play goals; SHG=Short-handed goals; GWG=Game-winning goals
      MIN=Minutes played; W = Wins; L = Losses; T = Ties; GA = Goals against; GAA = Goals against average; SO = Shutouts;

Awards and records

Transactions

Draft picks
Washington's draft picks at the 1977 NHL amateur draft held at the Mount Royal Hotel in Montreal, Quebec.

Farm teams

See also
1977–78 NHL season

References

External links
 

Washington Capitals seasons
Wash
Wash
Washing
Washing